(Heinrich) Albert Johne (10 December 1839 – 5 December 1910) (pronounced YOH-ne) was a pathologist born in Dresden, Germany.
He contributed to the literature of actinomycosis and trichinosis and discovered a method of staining bacterial capsules.

He studied in Dresden, and later worked at the Institute of Pathology at the Faculty of Veterinary Medicine in Leipzig as well as in its former location in Dresden.

He was instrumental in the introduction of meat inspection.

Johne's disease, a paratuberculosis disease of cattle he described in 1895, is named for him.

Sources
Who's Who in Science (Marquis Who's Who Inc, Chicago Ill. 1968)

References

1839 births
1910 deaths
German medical researchers